Balsdon is a surname. Notable people with the surname include:

 Grace Balsdon (born 1993), English field hockey player
 Greg Balsdon (born 1977), Canadian curler
 J. P. V. D. Balsdon (1901–1977), British historian 
 Megan Balsdon (born 1982), Canadian curler